Joseph Eduard Adolf Spier (26 June 1900 – 21 May 1978) was a popular Dutch artist and illustrator.

Life 
Jo Spier was born in Zutphen, the Netherlands. From 1924 to 1939 Jo Spier worked for the newspaper De Telegraaf where he created humorous illustrations and cartoons about everyday life. He also worked as a courtroom sketch artist and theater review artist for them. During World War II his subject matter became more political and he was arrested for his satirical depiction of Hitler. He was first sent to the camp at Westerbork, then to Villa Bouchina with his wife and three children. For a period of a few months in 1943 they were protected from transport to German concentration camps, supposedly due to the influence of the leader of the pro-German Nationaal Socialistische Beweging, Anton Mussert. On 21 April 1943 Spier was transferred to the Theresienstadt concentration camp, where he was held with his family until the end of the war. During his internment in Theresienstadt, Spier also cooperated with the Germans by assisting with the film Theresienstadt, ein Dokumentarfilm aus dem jüdischen Siedlungsgebied.

Emigration and death 
Jo Spier moved to the United States in 1951 with his family and continued to work until the end of his life. Spier died in Santa Fe, New Mexico on 21 May 1978.

Family 
Jo Spier was married to Albertine Sophie "Tineke" van Raalte and they had three children, Peter Spier, Thomas Spier (DDS), and Celine Spier. Peter Spier was also a noted illustrator of children's books.

Books illustrated by Jo Spier
The Creation, text from Genesis, hand-lettered by Joseph P Ascherl, New York: Doubleday & Company, 1970.
The Squirrel and the Harp, by David DeJong, New York: Macmillan, 1966.
The Spice Cookbook, by Avanelle Day and Lillie Stuckey, David White Company, 1964
Waters of the New World: Houston to Nantucket, by Jan de Hartog, New York: Atheneum, 1961.
Peter Stuyvesant of Old New York, by Anna Crouse and Russel Crouse, New York: Random House, 1954.
The Story of Louis Pasteur, by Alida Sims Malkus, New York: Grosset & Dunlap, 1952.
One Sky to Share: The French and American Journals of Raymond Leopold Bruckberger, New York: P. J. Kenedy & Sons, 1952.
Holland's House: a Nation Building a Home, by Peter Bricklayer, Haarlem, Netherlands: Joh. Enschede En Zonen, 1939.
Mijn Jordanertjes : kinderen, die ik gekend heb, by A van Vlaardingen, Utrecht: Bijleveld, 1931.
 Godfried Bomans: Kopstukken. Ill. Jo Spier. Amsterdam, Brussel, Elsevier 1947 etc. (27th pr., 1987)

Bibliography
Dat alles heeft mijn oog gezien. Herinneringen aan het concentratiekamp Theresienstadt 1942–1945. Amsterdam, Elsevier, 1978. 
 The Marshall Plan and You. The Hague, Netherlands, Ministry of Economic Affairs, 1949

About Jo Spier
Peter van Straaten & Jo Spier. Virtuoze tekenaars van het Nederlandse leven. Persmuseum Amsterdam, 2012. No ISBN
Jo Spier. Tekenaar van een tijdperk Samenst. door G.E. van Baarsel. Stedelijk Museum Zutphen, 2000. 
Jo Spier: Album. Amsterdam, Elsevier, 1957. No ISBN
Michel van der Plas: Vader en moeder. Baarn, Bosch& Keuning, 1987.  (Interviews with children of famous parents, a.o. Peter Spier)

Sources

External links 
 Jo Spier presented at Lambiek's Comiclopedia

1900 births
1978 deaths
Dutch Jews
Dutch illustrators
Dutch cartoonists
Dutch caricaturists
Jewish artists
Bookbinders
Courtroom sketch artists
People from Zutphen
Theresienstadt Ghetto survivors
Dutch emigrants to the United States